Macropelopia is a genus of European non-biting midges in the subfamily Tanypodinae of the bloodworm family (Chironomidae).

Tanypodinae
Diptera of Europe